Georges Rigal (6 January 1890 – 25 March 1974) was a French water polo player and freestyle swimmer who competed at the 1912 and 1924 Summer Olympics.

In 1912 he was a member of the French water polo team which finished fifth in the Olympic water polo competition. He played one match. He also participated in the 100 metre freestyle event, but was eliminated in the first round. Twelve years later he won a gold medal with the French water polo team. He played all four matches and scored one goal.

See also
 France men's Olympic water polo team records and statistics
 List of Olympic champions in men's water polo
 List of Olympic medalists in water polo (men)

References

External links

 

1890 births
1974 deaths
Swimmers from Paris
French male water polo players
French male freestyle swimmers
Olympic water polo players of France
Olympic swimmers of France
Swimmers at the 1912 Summer Olympics
Water polo players at the 1912 Summer Olympics
Water polo players at the 1924 Summer Olympics
Olympic gold medalists for France
Olympic gold medalists in water polo
Medalists at the 1924 Summer Olympics
Water polo players from Paris
Presidents of the French Swimming Federation